Grabham is a surname. It may refer to:

 Anthony Grabham (1930–2015), British surgeon
 George Wallington Grabham (1836–1912), New Zealand doctor
 Mick Grabham, guitarist of Procol Harum 1972–1977
 Oxley Grabham (1864–1939), British naturalist, ornithologist, and museum curator
 Tom Grabham (born 1991), Welsh rugby player

Patronymic surnames